Meteor Garden is a 2001 Taiwanese drama starring Barbie Hsu, Jerry Yan, Vic Chou, Ken Chu and Vanness Wu. It is the first live-action television adaptation of the Japanese shōjo manga series  by Yoko Kamio. It was later followed by a sequel in 2002.

Synopsis
The story centers around a poor teenage girl, Shancai (Barbie Shu), who at the insistence of her parents goes to a school for rich people. The school is dominated by Daoming Si (Jerry Yan), Huaze Lei (Vic Chou), Meizuo (Vanness Wu) and Ximen (Ken Chu)—four rich, handsome but arrogant students collectively known as the 'F4', short for 'Flower 4'. They are heirs to four rich and influential families in Taiwan. They terrorize the school by handing out red cards to those they do not like, which allows other students to bully the victims until they leave the school.

After one of Shancai's friends receives the wrath of the F4's leader, Daoming Si, she stands up to and berates him, which in turn results in a red card of her own. Shancai hates the arrogant and rude Daoming Si. Her persistence in standing up for what is right gradually gains the F4's respect and Daoming Si starts to fall for her. Shancai is attracted to the silent Huaze Lei in the beginning. But Daoming Si's constant yet annoying efforts has her question her feelings for both Huaze Lei and Daoming Si.

Later in the series, Daoming Si's mother comes to Taiwan. She instantly dislikes Shancai because of her poor background. Both Daoming Si and Shancai face hurdles his mother throws their way to separate them. Though Shancai does not profess her love for him yet, Daoming Si remains determined. The series show the journey of Daoming Si and Shancai's feelings for one another.

Cast

Main

Supporting

Soundtrack

Meteor Garden Original Soundtrack (流星花園 電視原聲帶) was released on 14 August 2001 by Various Artists under EMI. It contains thirteen songs, in which ten songs are English songs. The opening theme song is "Qing Fei De Yi" or "Can't Help Falling for You" by Harlem Yu, while the ending theme song is by Penny Dai entitled "你要的愛" or "The Love You Want".

The track, "情非得已" (Cant Help Falling In Love With You) was listed at number 21 on Hit Fm Taiwan's Hit Fm Annual Top 100 Singles Chart (Hit-Fm年度百首單曲) for 2001.<ref> [http://www.hitoradio.com/charts/3c.php?pageNum_rsList=0&ch_year=2001 2001 Hit Fm Annual Top 100 Singles Chart (#1 to 50)] Retrieved 16 April 2011</ref>

Track listing

Release
The series was first broadcast in Taiwan on free-to-air Chinese Television System (CTS) (華視) from 12 April to 16 August 2001. A supplementary mini-series called Meteor Rain was produced in August 2001 and the sequel Meteor Garden II was broadcast from November to December 2002.

Legacy
F4 and JVKV

F4 (Flower Four) or JVKV was a Taiwanese boy band consisting of Jerry Yan, Vanness Wu, Ken Chu, and Vic Chou. The group F4 was formed in 2001 after Meteor Garden ended. They released three albums, Meteor Rain (2001), Fantasy 4ever (2002), and Waiting for You (2007). According to Forbes'', F4 has sold 3.5 million copies of their first two albums all over Asia as of July 2003. In 2007, due to copyright issues, the group changed its name to JVKV, using the descending age of the initials of its members.

References

External links
  CTS Meteor Garden official homepage

Boys Over Flowers
Taiwanese drama television series
Chinese Television System original programming
2001 Taiwanese television series debuts
2001 Taiwanese television series endings
Taiwanese television dramas based on manga
Television shows written by Mag Hsu
Television shows filmed in Taiwan
Television series about bullying
Television series about teenagers
Television shows set in Taipei